Tears of April is a 2008 Finnish war drama film directed by Aku Louhimies. Based on the novel Käsky by Leena Lander, the film is set in the final stages of the Finnish Civil War.

Plot 
The film tells a story of a captured female Red Guard fighter, Miina, and the soldier Aaro who escorts her to her trial. The fictional character Emil Hallenberg is loosely based on the actual Erik Grotenfelt, a poet turned judge and executioner.

Cast 
 Samuli Vauramo as Aaro Harjula
 Pihla Viitala as Miina Malin
 Eero Aho as Emil Hallenberg
 Eemeli Louhimies as Eino
 Miina Maasola as Martta
 Riina Maidre as Beata Hallenberg
 Sulevi Peltola as Konsta
 Oskar Pöysti as Paasonen

References

External links 
 
 

2000s war drama films
Films based on Finnish novels
Films directed by Aku Louhimies
Films set in 1918
Films set in Finland
Films shot in Finland
Finnish Civil War
Finnish war drama films
Prisoner of war films
2008 drama films
2008 films